Ratnik (: warrior) can refer to:

Ratniks, a Bulgarian nationalist organization
Ratnik (program), Russian infantry combat system
Kamerton-N Ratnik, Russian autogyro
Ratnik (film), a Nigerian science fiction film

See also
Diane Ratnik, a Canadian volleyball player